Semanário Económico was a weekly business newspaper published in Lisbon, Portugal, from 1987 to 2009.

History and profile
Semanário Económico was first published on 16 January 1987. It had its headquarters in Lisbon. The paper was owned by Ongoing media, which bought it from the holding Económica. In the mid-2000s the paper was part of Media Capital.

Semanário Económico was mostly read in Greater Lisbon and Centre of Portugal. In 2007 the paper had a circulation of 9,000 copies. In 2008 the paper sold 9,954 copies. In August 2009 the paper was renamed as Weekend Económico.

References

1987 establishments in Portugal
2009 disestablishments in Portugal
Business newspapers
Defunct newspapers published in Portugal
Defunct weekly newspapers
Newspapers established in 1987
Newspapers published in Lisbon
Portuguese-language newspapers
Publications disestablished in 2009
Weekly newspapers published in Portugal